Erik Ujlaky (born 13 February 1992) is a Slovak footballer who plays as a winger who plays for USV Halbturn in Austria.

Dunajská Streda
He made his debut for Dunajská Streda against Slovan Bratislava on 12 July 2013.

References

External links
Corgoň Liga profile

Sparta Prague profile
Eurofotbal profile

1992 births
Living people
Slovak footballers
Association football midfielders
FC DAC 1904 Dunajská Streda players
FK Frýdek-Místek players
FC ViOn Zlaté Moravce players
KFC Komárno players
Slovak Super Liga players
Expatriate footballers in the Czech Republic
Expatriate footballers in Austria
Sportspeople from Trnava